Acetrax was a video on demand company which was founded in the UK and Switzerland and incorporated as a Swiss company in Zürich in 2006. The company was later acquired by Sky, a British telecommunications company. The company provided over-the-top (OTT) content in Europe, for connected TVs. As of 2011, the company claimed to have their contents on TVs in 282 million households, in 48 countries.

Sky acquired Acetrax in 2012 to expand their OTT capabilities. The gross assets of Acetrax stood at £2.3 million as of December 31, 2011, according to Sky.

By 2013, Acetrax had partnered with a variety of smart TVs and media players, including LG, Samsung, Toshiba, Panasonic, Philips and WD TV.

Acetrax ceased operations as of June 21, 2013. The service was integrated into Sky's on-demand service Sky Store.

Apps
As well as video on demand, Acetrax has also created an app which is embedded in phones such as Samsung, LG, Panasonic, Toshiba, Grundig.

See also

Cisco Systems
Enhanced TV
Hybrid digital TV
Hybrid Broadcast Broadband TV
Interactive television
Hotel television systems
List of digital distribution platforms for mobile devices
Over-the-top content
Tivoization

References

Information appliances
Digital television
Film and video technology
Interactive television
Internet broadcasting
Streaming television
Multimedia
Peercasting
Streaming media systems
Defunct video on demand services
Television technology